The 1995–96 Eliteserien season was the 39th season of ice hockey in Denmark. Ten teams participated in the league, and Esbjerg IK won the championship.

First round

Final round

Group A

Group B

Playoffs

3rd place
 Herning IK - Hvidovre Ishockey 2:0 (12:0, 9:2)

Final 
 Esbjerg IK - Rungsted IK 3:1 (6:0, 4:6, 6:5, 5:2)

External links
Season on hockeyarchives.info

Dan
Eliteserien (Denmark) seasons
1995 in Danish sport
1996 in Danish sport